Renae Lisa Camino (born 19 November 1986) is an Australian women's basketball player, who has represented the country at both junior and senior levels. In 2014, Camino married her long-time partner Tom Garlepp.

Biography

Camino commenced playing in the Women's National Basketball League (WNBL) in 2004. Since then, Camino has played for the AIS (2004/05), Townsville Fire (2006/07), Adelaide Lightning (2007/08 to 2009/10), Logan Thunder (2010/11 to 2011/12), Bendigo Spirit (2012/13), and Sydney Flames (2013/14 to current). Camino missed the entire 2005/06 WNBL season with a serious knee injury.

In season 2004/05, Camino won the WNBL Rookie of the Year Award for the most outstanding first year player. Then, in 2006, Camino was awarded the Australian Institute of Sport Junior Athlete of the Year. AIS Women’s Basketball head coach, Dean Kinsman said, Renae is a leader, with a fantastic work ethic who is dedicated to being the best she can be as an athlete and a person.

In the 2007/08 (2008) Grand Final, Camino won the MVP award after setting a league record for an individual score with 32 points. After her success in the 2008 Grand Final, Camino's career was stalled by further knee injuries. To resurrect her career, Camino was one of the first Australian athletes to have the controversial LARS surgery in 2009.

Camino nominated for the 2006 WNBA draft, and was selected in round 2 (pick 24 overall) by the Houston Comets, but did not play because of a knee injury. Camino was drafted again in the 2009 dispersal draft (pick 7) by the Sacramento Monarchs, but returned to Australia without playing a WNBA game.

At official FIBA events, Camino played for Australia at the 2005 World Championship for Junior Women; the 2007 FIBA Under 21 World Championship for Women, where she won a Silver medal; and the 2007 FIBA Oceania Championship for Women, where she won a Gold medal. At the 2005 World Championship, Camino top scored the tournament with 173 points an average of 21.6 points per game and was named to the All-Star Five.

References

1986 births
Living people
Australian women's basketball players
Australian Institute of Sport basketball (WNBL) players
Adelaide Lightning players
Logan Thunder players
Sydney Uni Flames players
Bendigo Spirit players
Townsville Fire players
Guards (basketball)